The following highways are numbered 34A:

United States
 Nebraska Spur 34A
 Nevada State Route 34A (former)
 New York State Route 34A (former)
 County Route 34A (Otsego County, New York)
 Oklahoma State Highway 34A